Rachel Carson High School for Coastal Studies is a public high school in Coney Island, Brooklyn, New York City. It is a part of the New York City Department of Education.

References

External links

Rachel Carson High School of Coastal Studies

Coney Island
Geography education in the United States
Public high schools in Brooklyn
High